The Revisionist school of Islamic studies, (also Historical-Critical school of Islamic studies and skeptic/revisionist Islamic historians)  is a movement in Islamic studies
that questions traditional Muslim narratives of Islam's origins.

Textual integrity of the Quran:
 The Quranic text as is in use today shows many differences to the earliest existing manuscripts. A core part of the Quran may derive from Muhammad's annunciations, yet some parts of the Quran were definitively added later or were reworked later. In addition to this, many small deviations came into the text as with other ancient texts which were manually copied and copied again.
 The existence and significance of the prophet Muhammad as a historical person depends especially on the question whether any, and if so, how many, parts of the Quran can be attributed to his time, or whether all or most parts of the Quran came into being only after Muhammad's time. The researchers' opinions differ over this question. Fred Donner suggests an early date for the Quran. (This thesis has been abandoned by many in the 21st century thanks to studies and dating of early Manuscripts.  Michael Cook, who earlier supported it, says recent studies are  “a testimony to the continuing accuracy of the transmission of the variants”. Tom Holland also agrees that "the evidence seems to suggest" that the contemporary standard Quran "was uttered by Muhammad in the period that Muslim tradition has insisted that he lived".)
 The Quran is not written in a "pure" Arabic as the Syriac language seems to have had a certain influence on the language of the Quran which was forgotten later. This could be a possible explanation of why a fifth of the Quranic text is difficult to understand.

Consolidation of religious authority:
 In the beginning, secular and spiritual power were united in the person of the caliph. There were no special religious scholars. Religious scholars came into being only later and conquered the spiritual power from the caliphs.

Origins and methodology
The influence of the different tendencies in the study of Islam in the West has waxed and waned. Ibn Warraq believes "the rise of this revisionist school" may be dated from the Fifth colloquium of the Near Eastern History Group of Oxford University in July 1975, and Robert Hoyland believes revisionists were ascendant in the 1970s and 1980s. 

Until the early 1970s, non-Muslim Islamic scholars—while not accepting accounts of divine intervention—did accept its origin story "in most of its details", and accepted the reliability of  tafsir (commentaries on the Quran), hadith (accounts of what the Islamic prophet Muhammad approved or disapproved of), and sira (biography of the prophet). Revisionists instead use a "source-critical" approach to this literature, as well as studying relevant archaeology, epigraphy, numismatics and contemporary non-Arabic literature. They believe these methodologies provide "hard facts" and an ability to crosscheck, whereas traditional Islamic accounts—written 150 to 200 years after Muhammad—are/were subject to biases of and embellishments by the authors and transmitters.

Post-War scholarship
From World War II to sometime around the mid-1970s, there was what scholar Charles Adams describes as "a distinctive movement in the West, represented in both religious circles and the universities, whose purpose" was to show both a "greater appreciation of Islamic religiousness" and to foster "a new attitude toward it" and in doing so make "restitution for the sins of unsympathetic, hostile, or interested approaches that have plagued the tradition of Western Orientalism". Herbert Berg gives Wilfred Cantwell Smith and W. Montgomery Watt as examples of proponents of this "irenic approach" (traditionalist) approach to Islamic history, and notes that the approach necessarily clashed with the questions and potential answers of revisionists since these clashed with Islamic doctrine.

Studies of Hadith
The revisionist school has been said to be based on the study of Hadith literature by Islamic scholars Ignác Goldziher (1850-1921) and Joseph Schacht (1902-1969), who argued that the traditional Islamic accounts about Islam's early times—written 150 to 250 years after Muhammad—cannot be relied on as historical sources.  Goldziher argued (in the words of R.S. Humphreys), "that a vast number of hadith accepted even in the most rigorously critical Muslim collections were outright forgeries from the late 8th and 9th centuries—and as a consequence, that the meticulous isnads which supported them were utterly fictitious". 

Schacht argued Islamic law was not passed down without deviation from Muhammad but "developed [...] out of popular and administrative practice under the Umayyads, and this practice often diverged from the intentions and even the explicit wording of the Koran ... norms derived from the Koran were introduced into Muhammadan law almost invariably at a secondary stage."

Extension of hadith-arguments
The revisionists extended this argument beyond hadith to other facets of Islamic literature—sira (Muhammad's biography), the history of the Quran's formation, and the historical developments under the first Islamic dynasty, the Umayyad Caliphate. The true historical events in the earliest times of Islam have to be newly researched and reconstructed (revisionists believe) by applying the historical-critical method, or alternately, in the words of Cook and Crone, historian must "step outside the Islamic tradition altogether and start again". This requires using the  
"source-critical approach to both the Koran and the Muslim literary accounts of the rise of Islam, the Conquest and the Umayyad period";
comparing traditional accounts with 
accounts from the seventh and eighth century CE that are external to the Muslim tradition;
archaeology, epigraphy, numismatics from the seventh and eighth century CE—sources which should be preferred when there is a conflict with Muslim literary sources.

Revisionists believe that the results of these methods indicates that (among other things) the break between the religion, governance, culture of the pre-Islamic Persian and Byzantine civilization, and that of the 7th century Arab conquerors was not as abrupt as the traditional history describes (an idea advanced  in the statement of the Fifth colloquium of the Near Eastern History Group of Oxford University). Colloquium organizers argued that if "we begin by assuming that there must have been some continuity, we need either go beyond the Islamic sources or [...] reinterpret them".

Heyday of the revisionist school
Hoyland believes the heyday of revisionism, diminished as the "public profile of Islam" increased "massively" sometime after the 1980s, when, (Hoyland argues) the tendency towards  "left-leaning" liberalism "shy of criticizing Islam", of Western academics "favored the traditionalist approach" while "pushing skeptics/revisionists to become more extreme." (Hoyland seeking to find a middle way between revisionism and avoiding criticism.)

The designation Revisionism was coined first by the opponents of the new academic movement and is used by them partially still today with a less than positive connotation. Then, the media took up this designation in order to call the new movement with a concise catchword. Today, also the adherents of the new movement use Revisionism to designate themselves, yet mostly written in quotation marks and with a slightly self-mocking undertone.

Major representatives 
Among the "foremost" proponents of revisionism are John Wansbrough (1928-2002), Patricia Crone (1945-2015), Michael Cook, Yehuda D. Nevo (1932-1992, and  Fred M. Donner.
The new movement originated at the SOAS (School of Oriental & African Studies) at the University of London with the publications of two works by Wansbrough: Quranic Studies (1977) and The Sectarian Milieu (1978).  Andrew Rippin (1950-2016), Norman Calder, G. R. Hawting, Patricia Crone and Michael Cook were students of  Wansbrough. In 1977 Crone and Cook published Hagarism, which postulated—among other things—that Islam was established after, not before, the Arab conquests and that Mecca was not the original Islamic sanctuary. Later, both distanced themselves from the theses of Hagarism as too far reaching, but continued to "challenge both Muslim and Western orthodox views of Islamic history". Martin Hinds (1941-1988), also studied at SOAS and Robert G. Hoyland was a student of Patricia Crone.

In Germany at the Saarland University,  Günter Lüling (1928-2014) and Gerd-Rüdiger Puin focused on the historical-critical research of the development of the Quran starting in the 1970s, and in the 2000s, Karl-Heinz Ohlig, Volker Popp, Christoph Luxenberg and Markus Groß argued that Muhammad was a legendary, not historical figure. Hans Jansen from the Netherlands published a work in 2005/7 arguing in detail why (he believed) known accounts of Muhammad's life were legendary. Yehuda D. Nevo also questioned the historicity of Muhammad. Sven Kalisch, a convert to Islam, taught Islamic theology before leaving the faith in 2008 when he questioned the historicity of Mohammad (as well as Jesus and Moses).  

James A. Bellamy has done textual criticism of the Quran and his proposed "emendations", i.e. corrections of the traditional text of the Quran.  Fred Donner, in his several books on early Islamic history has argued that only during the reign Abd al-Malik ibn Marwan (685-705) did the early ecumenical monotheism of the Arab conquerors begin to separate from Christians and Jews.

Popular historian Tom Holland's  work In the Shadow of the Sword (2012) has popularized the new research results and depicted a possible synthesis of the various revisionist approaches.

Publications

Scholarly

Patricia Crone and Michael Cook, Hagarism: The Making of the Islamic World (1977) 
In Hagarism: The Making of the Islamic World Patricia Crone and Michael Cook set aside traditional Islamic history to draw on archaeological evidence and contemporary documents in Arabic, Armenian, Coptic, Greek, Hebrew, Aramaic, Latin and Syriac. They depict a 7th-century Arab conquest of Byzantine and Persian lands that is not yet "Islamic". Various sources the conquered people (Greek , Syriac  or ) call their conquerors "Hagarenes" rather than Muslims. Instead of being inspired to conquest by a new prophet, holy book and religion, the Arabs are described as being in alliance with the Jews, following  a Jewish messianism to reclaim the Promised Land from the Byzantine Empire. The Qur'an came later (according to the authors) as a product of 8th-century edits of various materials drawn from a variety of Judeo-Christian and Middle-Eastern sources while Muhammad was the herald of Umar "the redeemer", a Judaic messiah.

Patricia Crone, Meccan Trade and the Rise of Islam (1987) 
In Meccan Trade and the Rise of Islam, Patricia Crone argues that Mecca could not have been a hub of overland trade from Southern Arabia to Syria in the time of Muhammad
for several reasons. It was not on the overland trade route from Southern Arabia to Syria, but even if it had been, that land route was not very important compared to the maritime trade route, and ceased to be used by the end of the second century AD at latest.  Meccan trade, except for Yemeni perfume, was mainly in cheap leather goods and clothing, and occasionally, in basic foodstuffs, which were not exported north to Syria, (which already had plenty of them), but to nearby regions. Furthermore, the literature of Arab trading partners who kept track of Arab affairs (Greek, Latin, Syriac, Aramaic, Coptic) makes no mention  "of Quraysh (the tribe of Mohammed) and their trading center Mecca". All of which suggests traditional "histories" passed down about Muhammad's life as a Meccan merchant traveling far and wide and suffering at the hands of powerful Meccan tribes are "pure fabrications", and it is far more likely Muhammad's career took place not in Mecca and Medina or in southwest Arabia at all, but in northwest Arabia.

Hans Jansen, De Historische Mohammed (2005/2007)
The arguments against the plausibility of the classical Islamic traditions about Islam's beginnings were summarized by Hans Jansen in his work De Historische Mohammed. Jansen points out that because of the cryptic nature of the Quran, which usually alludes to events rather than describing them, and seldom describes the situation for which a revelation was made, the historically questionable traditions are of great importance for the interpretation and understanding of the Quran.  Many Islamic traditions came into being long after Muhammad on the basis of mere guesses for what situation a Quranic verse had been revealed. Because of these historically questionable traditions, the interpretation of the Quran has been restricted ever since.

Non-scholarly
Ibn Warraq, an author known for his criticism of Islam, has compiled several revisionist essays in his book, The Quest for the Historical Muhammad. Fred Donner, reviewing the book, notes that by favoring Wansbrough's school of revisionism, the author presents a "one-sided selection" that fails to consider the challenges to this line of revisionism. The result is "a book that is likely to mislead many an unwary general reader."

Robert Spencer, a notable Islam critic, wrote a popular work on Islamic Revisionist Studies called Did Muhammad Exist?

Criticism of Revisionism 
The consequent historical-critical analysis of early Islam met severe resistance in the beginning since then provocative theses with far-reaching meaning were published without sufficient evidence. Especially Patricia Crone's and Michael Cook's book Hagarism (1977) stirred up a lot of harsh criticism. Important representatives of Revisionism like Patricia Crone or Michael Cook meanwhile distanced themselves from such radical theses and uncautious publications.

Criticism is expressed by researchers like Tilman Nagel, who aims at the speculative nature of some theses and shows that some revisionists lack some scholarly standards. On the other hand, Nagel accepts the basic impulse of the new movement, to put more emphasis on the application of the historical-critical method. 
A certain tendency to take revisionists seriously becomes obvious e.g. by the fact that opponents address their criticism not any longer to "revisionism" alone but to "extreme revisionism" or "ultra-revisionism".

Gregor Schoeler discusses the revisionist school and depicts the early controversies. Schoeler considers revisionism to be too radical yet welcomes the general impulse: "To have made us thinking about this all and much more remarkable things for the first time -- or again, is without any doubt a merit of the new generation of the 'skeptics'."

François de Blois, who is Teaching Fellow at the Department of the Study 
of Religions at SOAS, London, rejects the application of the historical-critical method to Islamic texts. He argues that this method was developed with Christian texts in mind, and thus, although it has been accepted as sound to be applied universally to any text (religious or not), there is no reason to apply this method to Islamic texts.

See also 
 Historicity of Muhammad
 Historiography of early Islam
 History of the Quran
 Narratives of Islamic Origins
 Nabataeans

References

Notes

Citations

Bibliography
 

Fred Donner: Muhammad and the Believers. At the Origins of Islam, Harvard University Press, 2010

Further reading 
 Fred Donner, Muhammad and the Believers. At the Origins of Islam (Harvard University Press; 2010)  
 Carlos Segovia: J. Wansbrough and the Problem of Islamic Origins in Recent Scholarship: A Farewell to the Traditional Account, book chapter in: The Coming of the Comforter: When, Where, and to Whom? Studies on the Rise of Islam and Various Other Topics in Memory of John Wansbrough, ed. by Carlos A. Segovia and Basil Lourié, Gorgias Press, 2012, pp. xv–xxiv.

External links
 Daniel Pipes (2012), Uncovering early Islam, National Review
 Razib Khan, The myth of Arabian paganism, and the Jewish-Christian origins of the Umayyads

Islamic studies
Asian studies
Muhammad
Quran
Islamic texts
Religious texts
 

Reform
Origins of Islam